Gamasa (also Romanized as Gamāsā; also known as Kamāsā) is a village in Jowzan Rural District, in the Central District of Malayer County, Hamadan Province, Iran. At the 2006 census, its population was 925, in 225 families.

References 

Populated places in Malayer County